Žemaitėliai (formerly known as) is a village in Vilnius District Municipality, Lithuania inhabited by Russians Pomorian Old Believers. According to the 2011 census, it had population of 21.

History 
Žemaitėliai village (known as Mitrophanovka then) with a community of Old Believers was established not later than 1876. A church was built in 1928, a cemetery and a library (with 285 books in 1936) established. Local Old Believers were mostly wealthy farmers (owners of 18–25 ha plots of land), masons, joiners, freelance workers. The community was hit by World War II and Soviet rule, when men were taken to the Red Army and some families deported to Siberia. In 1950, there were 45 families of Old Believers, but because of strong USSR anti-religious campaigns and propaganda of atheism as well as urbanization, the community shrank to only 10 families in 1997. After 1990, local church was restored. During the holidays, Old Believers from nearby Paberžė, Anavilis, Purnuškės, Akmena, Visalaukė villages gather in Žemaitėliai. A community house was built in 2014.

References 

Villages in Vilnius County
Vilnius District Municipality